Benjamin Kunkel (born December 14, 1972, in Colorado) is an American novelist and political economist. He co-founded and is a co-editor of the journal n+1. His novel, Indecision, was published in 2005.

Background and education
Kunkel was born in Glenwood Springs, Colorado, and grew up raised by hippie parents in Eagle, Colorado, formerly a cow town and now a town for commuters to Vail, Colorado. He was educated at St. Paul's School in Concord, New Hampshire. Kunkel studied at Deep Springs College in California, graduated with an A.B. from Harvard University, and received his MFA in Creative Writing at Columbia University.

Career
In addition to regularly writing for The New York Times, Kunkel has written for the magazines Dissent, The Nation, The New York Review of Books, The London Review of Books, The Believer, and The New Yorker. Kunkel has written multiple short stories and book reviews for the print journal he started with friends from college and graduate school, n+1. In the Fall 2004 issue, he published the short story "Horse Mountain," about an aging man. In the Spring 2005 issue, he published a review of J.M. Coetzee's works, imitating Coetzee's then-recent novel Elizabeth Costello. In the Fall 2005 issue, he published a short story "Or Things I Did Not Do or Say," about a man determined to kill another man.

Much of Kunkel's work exhibits a preoccupation with global social justice and leftist politics, including the Marxist overview Utopia or Bust: A Guide to the Present Crisis, the Kirchner essay Argentinidad, and the  anti-capitalist book The Commonist Manifesto. Kunkel is a member of the editorial committee of New Left Review.

Indecision
Indecision was published by Random House in 2005. Indecision begins with the acknowledgment, "For n+1." Kunkel has described the critically acclaimed novel as "overpraised."

Writings and interviews
Archives of his articles for other magazines
 Archive of Kunkel's writings for The Nation (1999–2005).
 Archive of Kunkel's writings for The Believer (2003).
Reviews
 "The Ideal Husband" – A review of D. H. Lawrence's The Lost Girl. Published in the New York Review of Books (February 24, 2005).
 "The Unreal World" – A review of Don DeLillo's The Body Artist, The Village Voice (February 14–20, 2001).
 "The Sea of Love" – A review of Lighthousekeeping by Jeanette Winterson, in The New York Times (May 1, 2005)
Interviews and reading
 "Benjamin Kunkel's Tale of Indecision" – Kunkel reads from his novel on NPR, (September 17, 2005).
 "Welcome to the political world" – Interview with Benjamin Kunkel in The Observer, (November 20, 2005).
 "Attack of the listless lads" – Half-flippant, half-serious conversation with Kunkel about dating, relationships, and more theoretical gender relations in Salon, (September 20, 2005).

Further reading
 Kelly, Adam. "From Syndrome to Sincerity: Benjamin Kunkel's Indecision." Diseases and Disorders in Contemporary Fiction: The Syndrome Syndrome. Ed. Timothy Lustig and James Peacock. London: Routledge, 2013. 53-66.
 Sauri, Emilio. "Cognitive Mapping, Then and Now: Postmodernism, Indecision, and American Literary Globalism." Twentieth-Century Literature 57.3 (Fall/Winter 2011): 472-91.

References

External links
 Metacritic Reviews – A compendium of reviews on Indecision available through the internet on metacritic.com.
 November 2006 NY Magazine article
 n+1 website

1972 births
Living people
St. Paul's School (New Hampshire) alumni
Deep Springs College alumni
Harvard Advocate alumni
Novelists from Colorado
American male novelists
Columbia University School of the Arts alumni